James Hough (born August 4, 1956) is a former professional American football player. Hough, an offensive lineman, played nine seasons in the National Football League for the Minnesota Vikings, playing in 111 games, and starting 78 of them.  He played college football for Utah State University where he was named to the College Football All-America Team and played in the 1977 college all star East-West Shrine Game.

In 2016, Hough was inducted into the Utah State University Hall of Fane

 

Hough is also known for his participation in the 1982 World's Strongest Man

He attended La Mirada High School where he played football and was on the first team that inaugurated their stadium in 1973.

He now coaches football for the Chaska Hawks in Chaska, Minnesota.

Hough has recently been inducted into both the La Mirada High School, and Utah State University Hall of Fame 

https://utahstateaggies.com/honors/hall-of-fame/jim-hough/27

References

1956 births
Living people
People from Greater Los Angeles
American football offensive linemen
Utah State Aggies football players
Minnesota Vikings players

https://utahstateaggies.com/honors/hall-of-fame/jim-hough/27